Anthony E. Munroe is the president of Borough of Manhattan Community College (BMCC). He previously served as President of  Essex County College, and the chairman and CEO of The Munroe Management Group, LLC, a healthcare management and leadership consulting practice. He most recently served as president of Advocate Trinity Hospital . On June 29, the City University of New York approved Munroe as President of Borough of Manhattan Community College effective October 1, 2020. He began his duties a month early on September 1.

Education
Munroe was reared in the Bronx, New York. Munroe completed his doctoral studies earning an Ed.D. in health education at Teachers College, Columbia University, in New York City. He holds a Master of Business Administration from Northwestern University's Kellogg Graduate School of Management and a Master of Public Health from Columbia University. His undergraduate degree is from Excelsior University.

References

External links 
 Kellogg EMP graduate Anthony Munroe named ACHE Young Executive of the Year
 The Robert S. Hudgens Memorial Award
 Anthony Munroe, Up & Comer
 BlackExperts.com - Dr. Anthony E. Munroe, Black Healthcare Expert

Living people
Year of birth missing (living people)
American health care chief executives
Kellogg School of Management alumni
American chief executives
Teachers College, Columbia University alumni
Columbia University Mailman School of Public Health alumni
Excelsior College alumni